The county of Cook is a cadastral division of Queensland, centred on the city of Bundaberg, and its name honours Captain James Cook. It was officially named and bounded by the Governor in Council on 7 March 1901 under the Land Act 1897.

Parishes 
Cook is divided into parishes, as listed below:

See also
 Lands administrative divisions of Queensland

References

External links 

 
 

Cook